Nothing Left may refer to:

"Nothing Left", by As I Lay Dying from their 2007 album An Ocean Between Us
"Nothing Left" (Kygo song), 2015 song by Kygo featuring Will Heard
"Nothing Left 1" and "Nothing Left 2," from the 1999 Orbital album The Middle of Nowhere
Nothing Left, a musical supergroup featuring current and former members of bands For Today, A Bullet for Pretty Boy, and Silent Planet